Frederick John "Fritz" Roegge (born August 12, 1958) is a retired United States Navy vice admiral who served as the 16th President of the National Defense University from September 25, 2017 to February 3, 2021. He previously served as Commander, Submarine Force, U.S. Pacific Fleet. Roegge was raised in Edina, Minnesota, graduated from the Institute of Technology at the University of Minnesota with a Bachelor of Mechanical Engineering degree in December 1980 and was commissioned through the NROTC program. He later earned an M.S. degree in engineering management from The Catholic University of America and an M.A. degree in national security and strategic studies from the Naval War College.

Personal
Roegge is the son of John Alex Roegge and Marilyn May (Panning) Roegge. His parents were married on September 15, 1957 in Carver County, Minnesota.

Roegge married Julie Anne Labeau on April 28, 1984 in Hennepin County, Minnesota.

References

1958 births
Living people
Place of birth missing (living people)
People from Edina, Minnesota
University of Minnesota alumni
Catholic University of America alumni
Naval War College alumni
United States submarine commanders
Recipients of the Legion of Merit
United States Navy vice admirals
Presidents of the National Defense University
Recipients of the Defense Superior Service Medal
Military personnel from Minnesota